Tritan Shehu is a member of the Assembly of the Republic of Albania for the Democratic Party of Albania. He was minister of foreign affairs from July 11, 1996 to April 12, 1997, minister of health from 1993 to 1996, and Vice Prime Minister of Albania from 1996 to 1997. Shehu also served as president of the Commission of Health in the Assembly of the Republic of Albania from 2005 to 2013. He is currently Vice Rector at the Catholic University "Our Lady of Good Counsel" (Albanian: Universiteti Katolik "Zoja e Këshillit të Mirë") and president of the Anesthesy and Reanimation Order in Albania.

References

Living people
Leaders of the Democratic Party of Albania
Albanian diplomats
Government ministers of Albania
Deputy Prime Ministers of Albania
Health ministers of Albania
Foreign ministers of Albania
Members of the Parliament of Albania
21st-century Albanian politicians
1954 births